Plectania milleri is a species of fungus in the family Sarcosomataceae. Found in western North America, it was described as new to science in 1969. It is named in honor of mycologist Orson K. Miller.

References

External links

Pezizales
Fungi described in 1969
Fungi of North America